Fatoumata Samassékou (born 31 December 1987, in Abidjan) is a swimmer who competed for Mali at the 2012 and 2016 Summer Olympics.

Athletic career 
In 2012, she competed in the women's 50 m freestyle and finished in 62nd place with a time of 31.88 seconds. In 2016, she competed in the same event and tied for 81st place with a time of 33.71 seconds.

Personal life 
Samassékou lived in ïssata Labita
and protested lack of compensation for demolitions in the area to make way for airport construction.

References

External links
 FINA profile

Living people
1987 births
Malian female swimmers
Olympic swimmers of Mali
Swimmers at the 2012 Summer Olympics
Swimmers at the 2016 Summer Olympics
Competitors at the 2011 All-Africa Games
Swimmers at the 2015 African Games
African Games competitors for Mali
Sportspeople from Abidjan
21st-century Malian people